The Tennis Tournament at the 2001 Mediterranean Games was held in Tunis, Tunisia from September 5–8.

Men's Final Eight

References
Results
First semifinal result
Second semifinal result

M
T
2001